Michael Wayne Johnson (born July 30, 1982, in Orlando, Florida) is an American pop singer and drummer, formerly of the boyband "Natural". He performed with various projects until joining Marc Terenzi in a new band Terenzi in 2008.

Early life
Michael Johnson began dancing at the age of 4. He eventually began to dance professionally, winning many awards and scholarships. He also danced for many Disney and television specials growing up.  At the age of 8, he began to study voice and performing in musical theatre.  At the age of 13, he won the titles "Mr. Dance of Florida" and "Teen Dancer of the year".

Natural

Many publicity stories exist as to how Natural was started, but the most likely one is that in 1999, Marc Terenzi met a man named Patrick King at a party.  Michael was friends with Patrick King, and Marc was friends with a man named Ben Bledsoe.  After many lineup changes, the men added Michael 'J' Horn to their lineup and decided to call themselves Natural

The boys tried to get signed with many major labels but were turned down despite a huge local following in Orlando, FL.  One day as they rehearsed at Transcontinental Studios, boyband king Lou Pearlman noticed them and liked their act.  Soon after, they were signed with Transcontinental Records.

Lou Pearlman had a new twist for his old boyband vision: not only would they dance, sing, and look cute, but they would also play instruments. Many of the other members already played various instruments but Michael had not.  It was through this arrangement that he started learning percussion.  By the time the first single was out, Michael was officially the drummer of the group and played well enough to be recorded on the first album 'Keep it Natural'.

Lou Pearlman spared no expense and promoted the guys' first single with Claire's and a tour with the Monkees.  However, American fame came slowly, and the band soon traveled to Germany, where they produced songs targeted to young women.  to conquer little girl's hearts.  They had much success with such hits as "Put Your Arms Around Me", "Will It Ever", and "Runaway".

In the summer of 2002 Marc Terenzi met German pop star Sarah Connor at a music festival, and the two soon began dating.  Their relationship continued despite Lou Pearlman's strict prohibitions of facial hair, of piercings or tattoos, and of girlfriends.

Meanwhile Michael was having his own trouble with Lou's rules.  He was dubbed the 'bad boy' in the image of the group but wasn't allowed to do anything remotely 'unwholesome'.  Although he had his lip piercing, Lou caused him to remove the jewelry.  On top of this he had to constantly have his hair in blue spikes – an image he kept until the group dismembered.

In the summer of 2003 Sarah Connor, became pregnant and the couple became engaged.  Around this time, Natural was coming back from a hiatus and releasing a single 'What if' from their 2nd album It's Only Natural.  Lou Pearlman wasn't happy with the news and wanted Marc kicked out of Natural and replaced with someone new.  The other members (except Patrick King) were not thrilled with this and decided to break Natural up.  They finished the tour and Michael was left to a new phase in life.

Life after Natural
Once Natural disbanded Michael wished to remain close to his now former band members.  He was asked to stay with the 'New Natural', which also would be run by Pearlman under the same format as the previous edition.  Although Patrick King had already agreed to this, Michael decided against the arrangement after a period of time.

After turning down the idea of staying in the 'New Natural' Michael got word that Marc Terenzi and Mike Castonguay (former producer and musical director for Natural) were forming a band named Jaded Rose with a third man named Paul Rippee.  But soon musical disagreements led to the band's dismemberment: Marc Terenzi wanted to continue to make pop rock songs, while the other members wanted to do something more pure rock.

From this situation Jaded Rose disbanded despite the offers of a reality TV show in Germany and a record deal.  Marc Terenzi kept with the pop rock style and the rest of the members went off to form Lukewarm Freeda.
Mike Castonguay and Michael wrote for the next four months and wrote songs such as Little Miss Get Around (which was featured on Veronica Mars) and Downtown Love which was featured in the movie I'm Through With White Girls.
Lukewarm Freeda was a more hard edged punk blues band. The band did some shows in Los Angeles, Nashville and Orlando with the addition of Paul Rippee as a touring bassist. Soon, Michael and Mike relocated to Los Angeles, where they worked together with several bands in the area.

Work with other bands
Michael continues to drum with Lukewarm Freeda as well as other bands including 'In for the Kill' and Capra.  In 2005 he formed his own label 'Blue Suede Records'.

2008: Terenzi
On May 7, 2008, it was announced on Marc Terenzi's official Myspace that he and Johnson had formed a new band alongside Benny Richter, "  It is true that I am forming a new band. A project that is more edgy and modern. We plan on taking the new music to a whole new level. music that both my old fans and new fans will like, that is why I will form a new band. We don't know what the name of the project should be but if you have any Ideas let us know. you never know maybe we pick a name you give us. The members that will always be a part of this new band are Myself, Benny Richter and Michael Johnson (Natural). We are bringing a whole lot more edge to our music and are busy working in the studio right now.
we have really big plans for this year so get ready for a crazy journey."

The new band is featured in the reality show, "Sarah and Marc: Crazy in Love" which will air on ProSieben in Germany.

In June 2008 it was announced the new group had been formed under the name 'Terenzi'.  'Terenzi' consisted of Johnson, Marc Terenzi, Benny Richter, Kai Stuffel and Christian Adameit. For their first single the group covered Michael Jackson's Billie Jean in a much slower arrangement.  "Billie Jean" was scheduled to be released on August 8, 2008. An album titled "Black Roses" is set to be released August 28, 2008.

2011: New Beat Fund
Presently, Johnson plays in New Beat Fund as a drummer. The band was formed in 2011 in Los Angeles and features guitarist/lead-vocalist Jeff Laliberte, bassist Paul Laliberte, guitarist Shelby Archer, and drummer Michael Johnson.

References

External links
 Official Michael Johnson Drummer Myspace Page

1982 births
Living people
Natural (band) members
American drummers
Lake Brantley High School alumni
21st-century American singers
21st-century American drummers
21st-century American male singers